Alexander Jefferson (November 15, 1921 – June 22, 2022) was an American Air Force officer, famous as one of the Tuskegee Airmen, the 332nd Fighter Group. He served in the United States Army Air Forces during World War II.

His book, Red Tail Captured, Red Tail Free: Memoirs of a Tuskegee Airman and POW, is a personal memoir of those who served America in World War II and after.

Early life
Jefferson was born in Detroit, Michigan on November 15, 1921, the eldest child of Alexander Jefferson and Jane White Jefferson. His maternal great-grandfather William Jefferson White was born to a slave woman and a white slave owner in the 1830s. Jefferson's grandfather became a minister, and in 1867, opened an all black ministry school for boys in Augusta, Georgia, which today is known as Morehouse College.

Jefferson attended Craft Elementary School, Munger Intermediate School, and Chadsey High School, graduating in 1938, the only African-American to take college preparatory classes. In 1942, he graduated from Clark College in Atlanta, Georgia, with a Bachelor of Science degree in Chemistry and Biology.

World War II

On September 23, 1942, he was sworn into the United States Army Reserve, volunteering but not accepted for flight training. Taking a job as an analytical chemist for three months, he entered the graduate school of Howard University, applying again to the US Army Air Force.

Called up for flight training in April 1943, Jefferson received orders to report to Tuskegee Army Air Field to begin flight training. Receiving his pilots wings and officer's commission at Tuskegee, he was assigned to the 332nd "Red Tail" Fighter group at the Ramitelli Airfield near Foggia, Italy, flying the P-51 Mustang. Assigned to a fighter escort wing protecting bombing missions of the US 15th Air Force, his job was to attack key ground targets and guard the bombing mission against enemy Nazi Luftwaffe fighters.

During his 19th mission over Toulon, southern France on August 12, 1944, while attacking a radar installation he was shot down. Parachuting to safety and landing within a forest, he was immediately captured by Nazi ground troops. He was sent to prisoner of war camp Stalag Luft III in Poland, a specialist Luftwaffe-run camp for captured Allied Air Force personnel. During his period of internment, Jefferson comments that he was treated like any other Air Force officer by his German captors. He was then moved to Stalag VII-A, just outside Dachau. After the Russian Army entered Poland, the prisoners were marched to Munich by the Germans, where they were freed by General George Patton's US Third Army. Jefferson returned to the United States on board the Cunard liner , arriving in New York city in mid-1945:

Postwar career
Jefferson served as an instrument instructor at Tuskegee Army airfield, until it closed in 1946. He remained in the US Air Force reserve, finally retiring in 1969. In 1947 Jefferson received his teaching certificate from Wayne State University, and began teaching elementary school science for the Detroit Public School System. He received his M.A. degree in education in 1954, and was appointed assistant principal in 1969. He retired in 1979 as an assistant principal, after over 30 years service. He celebrated his 100th birthday in 2021.

Personal life
Jefferson died in his home city, Detroit, Michigan on June 22, 2022, at the age of 100.

Legacy

Honors 
In 1995, Jefferson was enshrined in the Michigan Aviation Hall of Fame. In 2004, President George W. Bush awarded Jefferson a Purple Heart for being wounded while being shot down over German-occupied France. On March 29, 2007, Jefferson attended a ceremony in the U.S. Capitol rotunda, where he and all the other members of the Tuskegee Airmen (and their widows) were collectively awarded the Congressional Gold Medal in recognition of their service. 

Detroit, Michigan honored Jefferson for his service during WWII, with a metaphorical "key to the city" In 2021.

Military awards
Jefferson's decorations and awards include:

Additional awards include the Congressional Gold Medal, pictured.

Documentary
A documentary, The Luft Gangster: Memoirs of A Second Class Hero (2016), was made about the life and legacy of Jefferson.

See also

 Dogfights (TV series)
 Executive Order 9981
 List of Tuskegee Airmen
 Military history of African Americans
 List of Tuskegee Airmen Cadet Pilot Graduation Classes

References

Notes

External links
 Alexander Jefferson collection: Veterans History Project (Library of Congress)
 Fly (2009 play about the 332d Fighter Group)
 Tuskegee Airmen at Tuskegee University
 Tuskegee Airmen Archives at the University of California, Riverside Libraries.
 Tuskegee Airmen, Inc.
 Tuskegee Airmen National Historic Site (U.S. National Park Service) 
 Tuskegee Airmen National Museum

1921 births
2022 deaths
American centenarians
African-American centenarians
Men centenarians
Writers from Detroit
Clark Atlanta University alumni
Wayne State University alumni
Tuskegee University
Military personnel from Detroit
Military personnel from Tuskegee, Alabama
Tuskegee Airmen
United States Army Air Forces officers
Congressional Gold Medal recipients
Educators from Michigan
African-American aviators
United States Army Air Forces pilots of World War II
United States Army personnel of World War II
United States Army reservists
United States Air Force reservists
United States Air Force colonels
21st-century African-American people